Oberrothenbach is a village (Ortsteil) and former municipality in Saxony, Germany. It was incorporated into the municipality of Zwickau in 1999. Its population was 647 in 2018. Oberrothenbach is situated on the left bank of the Zwickauer Mulde, 6 km north of the centre of Zwickau.

History 

Oberrothenbach was first established sometime in the Early Middle Ages. Local legend tells that a small village and bishopric was first attempted by a disciple of Saint Boniface. The disciple saw an apparition of the Virgin Mary appear on the local lake and speak to him, "Here you will build a haven for laborers." However, the settlement was later overrun by migrating pagan Slavic tribes around the 9th century AD. The settlement later flourished as a mining area by the Late Middle Ages. During the Industrial Revolution in the German Empire, industrial mineral mining would be established in the town and many moved to Oberrothenbach to work.

After the end of World War II, the Soviet Union secretly set up an industrial operation in Occupied Germany and later East Germany, particularly in the villages of the region such as Wismut and Oberrothenbach. Before the end of the Cold War and fall of the communist regime, over 20,000 workers died from harsh labor, radiation and other pollution. Conditions were so bad, the local saying of the region was "Kumpels sterben früher", German for "miners die young".

Although the operation is now abandoned, the effects last to this day. About 450,000 people worked in the factories and mines in the village's history. Exposed to radon, arsenic, radioactive dust, lead, and other toxic compounds, an estimated 10-15,000 deaths are expected from illnesses such as cancer. A barbed-wire fence was built around the local polluted lake in the 1980s, which no longer supports most life.

Today 

Oberrothenbach is a quiet village within Zwickau, hosting approximately 700 inhabitants, mainly working-class. The population was less than 400 in 1993. The village hosts several events and attractions for tourists such as festivals common in German culture.

Population

References

External links 
 
 Oberrothenbach im Digitalen Historischen Ortsverzeichnis von Sachsen

Districts of Zwickau
Former municipalities in Saxony